Hemmat Expressway is an expressway in southeastern Isfahan, Iran.

Streets in Isfahan